Gonahran (also Romanized as Gonahrān and Gonharān; also known as Golharān, Gūlhārūn, and Qolharān) is a village in Karvan-e Olya Rural District, Karvan District, Tiran and Karvan County, Isfahan Province, Iran. At the 2006 census, its population was 1,021, in 286 families.

References 

Populated places in Tiran and Karvan County